East Newbern is an unincorporated community in Jersey County, Illinois, United States.

References

Unincorporated communities in Jersey County, Illinois
Unincorporated communities in Illinois